Torta alla Monferrina, an autumn speciality of the Monferrato hills in north-west Italy, is a cake made from pumpkin, or apples and sugar, with amaretti, chocolate, eggs, and rum, and baked in the oven.

See also
 List of cakes
 List of Italian desserts and pastries

References

Cuisine of Piedmont
Monferrato
Italian cakes